Amphisbaena lumbricalis is a species of worm lizard found in Brazil.

References

lumbricalis
Reptiles described in 1996
Endemic fauna of Brazil
Reptiles of Brazil
Taxa named by Paulo Vanzolini